Pontobasileus is an archaeocete whale known from a fragment of a single tooth described by .  It can questionably be dated to the Eocene of Alabama.

Leidy assigned the tooth to Archaeoceti, but without neither a stratigraphic nor a geographic locality it is virtually impossible to argue for or against this classification.  The tooth was later classified as an Archaeoceti incertae sedis and even a squalodont odontocete (a more recent whale), but can also be assigned to Protocetidae.

References
 Notes

 Sources

 
 
 
 

Archaeoceti
Prehistoric cetacean genera